"Llamado de Emergencia" is the second single by Puerto Rican reggaeton artist Daddy Yankee from the soundtrack to the motion picture Talento de Barrio, released on September 23, 2008, by El Cartel Records. It is the third released promo single and second official single.

As part of Daddy Yankee's goal to experiment with different latin musical styles, the song is a fusion of reggaeton and even Colombian styles of vallenato.

Music video
The music video features Daddy Yankee waiting in a car, with his soon-to-be next single, "¿Qué Tengo Que Hacer?" playing. A woman shows up to his car, revealed to be his girlfriend, having arrived late. She and him start having an argument in a car. Soon afterwards, Yankee pulls out and gets into a car crash, leaving fatal injuries on his girlfriend. It is soon reported to 9-1-1, leaving Yankee to only reminisce about the memories he has of them spending time together, later going to her funeral to bring flowers to her body, but seeing her in a chair, crying.  He then goes to see the body, and it is revealed he is the one who has died.  Remembering everything, he awakes in the car that he was at the start, with her coming up to the car again, revealing it was a dream. This time he does not argue with her. The video was directed by Luis Enrique.

Charts

References

External links
 "Llamado de Emergencia" music video at YouTube

Spanish-language songs
Daddy Yankee songs
2008 singles
Songs written by Daddy Yankee
2008 songs
Interscope Records singles